Jiří Prokopius (born 1 July 1967) is a Czech modern pentathlete. He competed at the 1988 and 1992 Summer Olympics.

References

External links
 

1967 births
Living people
Czech male modern pentathletes
Olympic modern pentathletes of Czechoslovakia
Czechoslovak male modern pentathletes
Modern pentathletes at the 1988 Summer Olympics
Modern pentathletes at the 1992 Summer Olympics
People from Strakonice
Sportspeople from the South Bohemian Region